Nightfall is a 2000 American straight-to-video science-fiction thriller film directed by Gwyneth Gibby and loosely based on Isaac Asimov's short story of the same name. The film stars Jennifer Burns, Winsome Brown, Joseph Hodge, David Carradine and Ashish Vidyarthi in the lead roles.

Cast
 Jennifer Burns
 Winsome Brown
 Joseph Hodge
 David Carradine
 Ashish Vidyarthi
 Pradeep Rawat
 Tony Mirrcandani
 Sushant Kumar
 Smita Hai
 Varun Vardhan
 Lalith Sharma

Production 
The film was shot in India.

References

External links
 
 

2000 films
American thriller films
2000 thriller drama films
2000 science fiction films
Films shot in India
2000 drama films
Films based on works by Isaac Asimov
Nightfall (Asimov)
2000s English-language films
2000s American films